Jet Fighter is an arcade shooter video game released in 1975 by Atari, Inc. It was distributed in Japan by Nakamura Seisakusho (Namco).

Technology
The game is housed in a custom cabinet that includes two 8-way joysticks (one per player) meant to look like older style flight sticks.  Each stick has a fire button mounted on the top.

Gameplay
The players fly in simulated jets around the screen, engaging in a dogfight and attempting to score hits on their opponent within a limited amount of time. When a player is hit, their plane spins around and an explosion is heard. After a few seconds, the plane recovers, pointing at a random direction.

Legacy
 A clone of the game, bearing the same name, was released by Atari subsidiary Kee Games.
 A home console port was included in the Atari 2600 game cartridge Combat.
 Dogfight by Microlab for Apple II.

References

1975 video games
Arcade video games
Atari 2600 games
Atari arcade games
Discrete video arcade games
Video games developed in the United States